The Atlantic Women's Colleges Conference was an eight-member college athletics conference founded in 1995 and given official status in 1999. It competed in NCAA Division III and as its name implies, only offered championships in women's sports.  In the conference's later years, several of its members finally became co-educational.  Following the 2006–07 season these members, seeking homes for their newly created men's athletic programs departed for other conferences.  Other members also switched affiliations, leaving the conference without enough members to be officially sanctioned.  Following the 2007 spring season, the conference ceased operations.

Member schools

Final members

Notes

Membership timeline

Championships offered
 Basketball
 Field hockey 
 Lacrosse
 Soccer
 Softball
 Swimming
 Tennis
 Volleyball

Defunct NCAA Division III conferences
Women's sports organizations in the United States
Organizations established in 1995
Organizations disestablished in 2007
1995 establishments in the United States
2007 disestablishments in the United States